Rajendra Talak is an Indian film director, from Goa, India. He is best known for his award-winning Konkani films, Aleesha and O Maria.

Early life
Talak was born in Comba, Margao, Goa, India. He attended the Mahila Nutan and Popular High Schools in Margao and later joined Parvatibai Chowgule College, from which he graduated with a bachelor's of science. He was a state-ranked table tennis player, and represented his college in table tennis and badminton competitions.

In the 1970s, Talak was a part of tabla player Sushant Keshav Naik's Mahesh Kumar & Party music group. The group merged into the Gomant Vidya Niketan Kala Vibha, and staged award-winning dramas in Marathi. Talak's experience in drama and theatre, led him to a love for cinema. While composing the music for their play, Shitu, Talak decided that the story was worth making into a movie, beginning his journey into filmmaking.

Career
Talak began his career with the tele-film Shitu in 1994, which was based on a child widow. Talak received praise for this film from director Shyam Benegal, whom he had invited for the film's release.

In 2002, Talak decided to make a film about the pollution caused by mining in Goa. Upon learning that Goa would host the International Film Festival of India in 2004, Talak quickly finished the shooting and post production of Aleesha. The film premiered at the 35th International Film Festival of India and went on to win the National Film Award for Best Feature Film in Konkani at the 52nd National Film Awards.

His next film was bilingual, titled Antarnaad in Konkani and Savalee in Marathi, and  premiered at the IFFI 2006. It won five national awards and seven state awards. He then made another bilingual film, Saavariyaa.com in 2010, about internet marriages in Goa. Talak's 2011 film, O Maria, dealt with the loss of identity that Goa faced and was a commercial success in the state.

In 2014, Talak released the Marathi film A Rainy Day, which was about corruption. It was screened at the Jagran Film Festival in Mumbai in 2014.

In 2016, Talak was appointed as the Vice-Chairman of Entertainment Society of Goa (ESG) by the Government of Goa. ESG co-hosts the International Film Festival of India.

In 2019, Talak directed the drama film Miranda House.

Incident at IFFI 2018
On 22 November 2018, at the 49th International Film Festival of India, delegates who had gathered to watch the Danish crime thriller The Guilty began protesting at Kala Academy when they were not allowed to enter the theater. This led to an argument between them and the organizers, in which Talak was quoted as asking delegates from Kerala to "go back home". A complaint was filed by Kerala-based director Kamal KM to IFFI CEO, Ameya Abhyankar. Following this, 29 other Malayali delegates, including 11 National Film winners like Dileesh Pothen and Dr Biju, signed a petition requesting a formal apology from Talak. When asked to comment, Talak replied that he had simply told the delegates to go back as the show was completely booked.

Filmography

Personal life
Talak also runs a construction business named "Talak Constructions". He also co-founded the "Kalangan Centre for Performing Arts" in Margao, of which he has previously been the president. Talak has planted trees under the Swachh Bharat Mission in his hometown of Margao. He also helps out in the landscaping of mini gardens in the city.

Talak lives in Borda, Margao, with his wife, Priyanka Bidaye (who starred in Aleesha) and son Manas.

References

External links 
 

Living people
Film directors from Goa
Konkani-language film directors
21st-century Indian film directors
People from South Goa district
Year of birth missing (living people)